Ahora is the first live album by the punk rock band Fiskales Ad-Hok. It was recorded live at a concert at the local "La Batuta", in April 2000, and released a few months later, under CFA, an independent record label created by the same Fiskales Ad-Hok. This album is where the new drummer "Memo" makes its debut in the band. Furthermore, after launching this album on their first European tour, which leads to 8 countries (Germany, Netherlands, Belgium, Switzerland, Italy, Austria, Czech Republic and Poland) where they play in a circuit squats and social centers, achieving recognition at the European punk scene.

Track listing
 "Odio"
 "Lorea Elvis"
 "Carrusel"
 "No estar aquí"
 "Campanitas"
 "La Mancha del Jaguar"
 "Ten Piedad"
 "Cuando muera"
 "Caldo E'Caeza"
 "Gordo"
 "Algo"
 "Al puerto"
 "Tevito"
 "Perra"
 "Ponk"
 "El Circo"
 "Hambre del corazón"
 "Eugenia"
 "Ranchera"
 "A & R"
 "Resistiré"
 "El Condor"

Personnel
Álvaro España – vocals
Viper – guitar
Memo – drums
Roly Urzua – bass

2000 live albums
Fiskales Ad-Hok live albums
Spanish-language live albums